Albert Dwayne Roloson (born October 12, 1969) is a Canadian former  professional ice hockey goaltender and former goaltending coach of the Anaheim Ducks of the National Hockey League (NHL). He is currently the Goaltending Coach and Director of Player Development for Lake Superior State University Men's Ice Hockey of the Central Collegiate Hockey Association (CCHA).

During his NHL career, Roloson played for the Calgary Flames, Buffalo Sabres, Minnesota Wild, Edmonton Oilers, New York Islanders and Tampa Bay Lightning. 

He is often affectionately referred to by his fans as "Roli". Following Mark Recchi's retirement in 2011, Roloson became the oldest active NHL player at the time and the last active NHL player to have been born in the 1960s.

Early life and education 
Roloson was born on October 12, 1969 in Simcoe, Ontario. He graduated from the University of Massachusetts Lowell.

Playing career

Pre-NHL, Calgary and Buffalo
A Hobey Baker Award nominee and National Collegiate Athletic Association All-American while tending goal for University of Massachusetts Lowell, Roloson went undrafted after graduating. He was signed as a free agent by the NHL's Calgary Flames in 1994. After splitting time between the Flames and their American Hockey League (AHL) counterpart, the Saint John Flames, he was signed as a free agent by the Buffalo Sabres to back up Dominik Hašek. Following two years with the Sabres, he was picked up in the 2000 NHL Expansion Draft by the Columbus Blue Jackets. Rather than joining the Blue Jackets, Roloson signed with the AHL team of the St. Louis Blues, the Worcester IceCats.

NHL career

Minnesota Wild
Roloson earned a roster spot with the Minnesota Wild in 2001. In the 2002–03 season, Roloson shared goaltending duties with Manny Fernandez as the Wild made their first ever appearance in the Stanley Cup playoffs, reaching the Western Conference Final. Despite splitting goaltending duties with Fernandez, Roloson earned his first All-Star appearance at age 34, appearing in the 2004 NHL All-Star Game with the Western Conference team. He also won the Roger Crozier Saving Grace Award for having the NHL's best save percentage. During the 2004–05 NHL lockout, Roloson played for Lukko of the Finnish SM-liiga.

Edmonton Oilers
On March 8, 2006, Roloson was traded to the Edmonton Oilers in exchange for the first round pick that later became part of a trade for Pavol Demitra and a conditional draft pick that later became a third-rounder. Initially, Oilers general manager Kevin Lowe was harshly criticized for the acquisition when Roloson struggled during the regular season. Lowe was criticized both for not acquiring a better goaltender, and also for surrendering a first-round draft pick to a divisional rival.

Criticism was muted following sensational play by Roloson, backstopping the Oilers to the final of the 2006 playoffs. He had a record of 12–5 through the first three rounds, and along with Chris Pronger, was considered a front-runner for the Conn Smythe Trophy as playoff MVP if the Oilers were victorious in the finals.

However, during Game 1 of the Stanley Cup Finals against the Carolina Hurricanes, Roloson suffered a third-degree MCL sprain of his right knee when Hurricanes forward Andrew Ladd was pushed into Roloson by a back-checking Oiler defenseman Marc-André Bergeron. Oilers head coach Craig MacTavish announced Roloson would not be able to continue in the series. It was also learned he had hyper-extended his right elbow in the collision as well. Back-up goaltender Ty Conklin replaced Roloson for the remainder of Game 1 and co-backup goalie Jussi Markkanen finished the series. The Oilers lost to the Hurricanes in seven games. Months of intense rehabilitation would follow in order to prepare Roloson for the 2006–07 season.

Roloson could have tested the unrestricted free agency market in the summer of 2006 but opted to re-sign with the Oilers on July 1, 2006, on a three-year contract.

In the 2007–08 season, Roloson started out strong before seeing his record fall to 7–12–0. By early January 2008, backup goaltender Mathieu Garon had taken the reins as starter. It was not until March 13, 2008, that Roloson saw regular play, coming in as relief for an injured Garon, starting each subsequent game.

When the 2008–09 season began, Roloson found himself vying for the starting goaltender position with Garon and upstart Jeff Deslauriers. For the beginning of the season, it appeared Garon was once again the starter but after some bad games Oiler head coach Craig MacTavish decided to rotate Garon, Deslauriers and Roloson by playing whoever had the hot hand. Eventually, the team traded Garon to the Pittsburgh Penguins and Roloson claimed the starting spot. Down the stretch, he started 36 consecutive games as the Oilers fought for a playoff spot. During this time, he became the oldest goaltender to start more than 60 games in a single season. Though the Oilers ultimately did not qualify for the playoffs, Roloson put up solid numbers, making upwards of 40 saves on a regular basis.

New York Islanders
On July 1, 2009, Roloson became an unrestricted free agent. After rejecting a one-year, $3 million offer from Edmonton, Roloson signed a two-year, $5 million contract with the New York Islanders. The Islanders also signed Martin Biron, who was to serve as Roloson's backup goaltender while Rick DiPietro was out on injured reserve. Roloson lost his first game as an Islander on October 3, 2009, in a shootout.

On November 23, 2009, Roloson made 58 saves on 61 shots in a 4–3 overtime win over the Toronto Maple Leafs. The 58 saves were a career high, and broke the Islander club record of 56, held by Rick DiPietro.

Tampa Bay Lightning
On January 1, 2011, Roloson was traded to the Tampa Bay Lightning in exchange for defenceman Ty Wishart. He won his first game with Tampa Bay in a 1–0 overtime shutout against the Washington Capitals. In his first 11 games with the Lightning, he recorded four shutouts. In April 2011, Roloson recorded a shutout in a first round playoff Game 7 against the Pittsburgh Penguins, making him the oldest goaltender to do so. Roloson and the Lightning ultimately advanced to the 2011 Eastern Conference Finals, where they were eliminated by the Boston Bruins in seven games. With his contract set to expire, the Lightning signed Roloson to a one-year, $3 million contract extension on June 29, 2011. He retired at season's end after the Lightning failed to qualify for the 2012 playoffs.

International play
Roloson was a member of the Canadian 2007 IIHF World Championship team that won gold in a 4–2 win against Finland in Moscow.

In 2009, Roloson (along with Oilers teammate Shawn Horcoff) was called upon for Canada at the 2009 IIHF World Championship. He played in the finals against Russia, which Canada lost 2–1.

Post-playing career
Following his retirement from ice hockey, Roloson was immediately hired as a consultant to the Anaheim Ducks' AHL affiliate, the Norfolk Admirals. On June 10, 2013, Roloson was named as the replacement for Pete Peeters as the Anaheim Ducks' goaltending consultant. On November 2, 2014, he suited-up in an emergency role after Ducks goaltender John Gibson suffered a pre-game injury and could not play the game against the Colorado Avalanche.

Personal life
Roloson and his wife Melissa, who were married in 1999, have two sons. He is close friends with Rob Blake, with whom he played minor hockey in Simcoe, Ontario. He is also friends with Andrew Brunette.

The Saint Paul Police Federation swore in Dwayne Roloson as an honorary police officer for his interest and involvement with local law enforcement. He teaches his goalie school with Minnesota Wild goaltending coach Bob Mason.

While with the Tampa Bay Lightning, Roloson wore a mask that had a shamrock with the initials "KR" to remember Kelly Ryan, a 12-year-old player who attended several of Roloson's goalie camps. The shamrock also had the letters "TDLO", "The Dream Lives On".

Career statistics

Regular season and playoffs

International

Awards and honors

References

External links
 
 Dwayne Roloson's player profile at hockeygoalies.org

1969 births
Anaheim Ducks coaches
Buffalo Sabres players
Calgary Flames players
Canadian expatriate ice hockey players in Finland
Canadian ice hockey coaches
Canadian ice hockey goaltenders
Edmonton Oilers players
Ice hockey people from Ontario
Living people
Lukko players
Minnesota Wild players
National Hockey League All-Stars
New York Islanders players
Rochester Americans players
Saint John Flames players
Sportspeople from Norfolk County, Ontario
Tampa Bay Lightning players
UMass Lowell River Hawks men's ice hockey players
Undrafted National Hockey League players
Worcester IceCats players
AHCA Division I men's ice hockey All-Americans